Antoine Guillaume Joseph Gaston, comte Errembault de Dudzeele (Tournai 16 October 1819 – St Petersburg 6 February 1888) was a Belgian diplomat.

Biography
Errembault served as Minister of the King of the Belgians to the Ottoman Empire and to the Kingdom of Greece from 1861 to 1867, and to the Russian Empire from 1867 until his death. On 10 October 1861 he signed a commercial treaty between the Kingdom of Belgium and the Sublime Porte.

By his wife Countess Marie-Helene von Abensperg und Traun, whom he married in Vienna on 17 September 1846, he had a son, Gaston, who also became a diplomat.

Honours
Errembault de Dudzeele was a knight in the Order of Leopold and in the Austrian Order of the Iron Crown, third class.

References

1819 births
1888 deaths
People from Tournai
Counts of Belgium
Ambassadors of Belgium to Turkey
Ambassadors of Belgium to Greece
Ambassadors of Belgium to Russia
Recipients of the Civic Decoration
Recipients of the Order of St. Anna, 1st class
Recipients of the Order of the Medjidie, 2nd class